Hydractiniidae is a cnidarian family of athecate hydroids.

Genera
The World Register of Marine Species includes the following genera in the family:

Bouillonactinia Miglietta, McNally & Cunningham, 2010
Clava Gmelin, 1788
Clavactinia Thornely, 1904
Cnidostoma Vanhöffen, 1911
Distichozoon Cairns, 2015
Fiordlandia Schuchert, 1996
Hydractinia Van Beneden, 1844
Hydrissa Stechow, 1922
Hydrocorella Stechow, 1921
Janaria Stechow, 1921
Parahydractinia Xu & Huang, 2006
Podocoryna M. Sars, 1846
Schuchertinia Miglietta, McNally & Cunningham, 2010
Stylactis Allman, 1864

References

 
Filifera
Cnidarian families